Erik Wiik-Hansen (3 July 1934 – 5 March 2008) was a Norwegian competitive sailor. He was born in Bærum. He competed at the 1968 Summer Olympics in Mexico City, in the dragon class.

References

External links
 

1934 births
2008 deaths
Sportspeople from Bærum
Norwegian male sailors (sport)
Olympic sailors of Norway
Sailors at the 1968 Summer Olympics – Dragon